Janer Guaza Lucumí (born November 12, 1991) is a Colombian footballer who currently plays for Club Petrolero in the Liga de Fútbol Profesional Boliviano.

Playing career 
Guaza began his career in 2009 with Atlético Huila in the Categoría Primera A, where he would play a total of 21 matches and score three goals. In 2011, he signed with Cúcuta Deportivo appearing in only in one match. On May 2, 2012, SC Toronto of the Canadian Soccer League announced the signing of Guaza for the 2012 season. He made his debut for the club on July 20, 2012 in a match against Mississauga Eagles FC. In 2013, he went abroad to Bolivia to sign with Club Petrolero in the Liga de Fútbol Profesional Boliviano.

References 

Living people
1991 births
Colombian footballers
Atlético Huila footballers
Canadian Soccer League (1998–present) players
Categoría Primera A players
Cúcuta Deportivo footballers
Bolivian Primera División players
SC Toronto players
Association football midfielders
Sportspeople from Cauca Department
20th-century Colombian people
21st-century Colombian people